A list of books and essays about Luis Buñuel:

References

Bunuel, Luis